The City of Kogarah was a local government area in the St George region of southern Sydney, in the state of New South Wales, Australia.

The Municipality of Kogarah was established on 22 December 1885 and in 2008 Kogarah became the first local government area in New South Wales to become a city by popular vote. The city was bounded by the Illawarra railway line, Georges River, Rocky Point Road, Princes Highway and Harrow Road. The name Kogarah is Aboriginal, meaning place of reeds and takes its name from the reeds that grew in the inlets along the Georges River and at the head of Kogarah Bay. On 12 May 2016, the NSW Government announced that Kogarah and Hurstville councils would merge to form Georges River Council with immediate effect.

Council history
The "Municipal District of Kogarah" was proclaimed on 23 December 1885, and the district's boundaries commenced at the intersection of the Illawarra Railway Line with the northern shore of Georges River. The Municipal District was renamed the "Municipality of Kogarah" following the passage of the Municipalities Act, 1897 on 6 December 1897. On 22 December 1916 and 1 January 1969, parts of Municipality of Rockdale were transferred to Kogarah. Kogarah was proclaimed a city in 2008.

In December 1920, Kogarah combined with the councils of Rockdale, Hurstville, and Bexley to form the St George County Council. The elected County Council was established to provide electricity to the Kogarah, Rockdale, Hurstville, and Bexley areas, and ceased to exist when it was amalgamated with the Sydney County Council on 1 January 1980.

Council Chambers
In 1910 the council acquired land in Belgrave Street, Kogarah, for £285. The foundation stone of the Council Chambers was laid 27 March 1912 by the Mayor W. J. Jones and was designed by Alderman Charles Herbert Halstead. The completed Council Chambers was officially opened on 7 September 1912 by the Governor, Lord Chelmsford.

The 1912 Council Chambers had had many alterations, including a first floor addition completed to a design by architects Moore & Dyer in 1937 which had required the council to hold its meetings at the St George County Council headquarters in Montgomery Street while construction occurred. The newly remodelled chambers were officially reopened by the Minister for Local Government, Eric Spooner, on 28 April 1937. In 1970 it was decided to replace the old council chambers, which were demolished to make way for the Kogarah Civic Centre, opened by Governor Sir Roden Cutler in 1973.

Amalgamation
Efforts to bring about a unified council for the St George area were raised regularly since 1901 and the 1946 Clancy Royal Commission into local government boundaries recommended the amalgamation of the municipalities of Hurstville, Kogarah, Rockdale and Bexley. In the following act of parliament passed in December 1948, the Local Government (Areas) Act 1948, the recommendations of the commission were modified, leading only to the merger of Bexley and Rockdale councils. A merger was again considered in the 1970s, but 1977 plebiscites run in Hurstville and Kogarah rejected the idea. A further idea of amalgamating Kogarah and Hurstville with Sutherland Shire to the south was raised in 1999 but did not progress. Kogarah opposed an attempt by the NSW Government to amalgamate with Hurstville and Rockdale in 2003.

On 12 May 2016, the NSW Government announced that Kogarah and Hurstville would merge to form Georges River Council with immediate effect.

Suburbs and localities in the former local government area 
Suburbs in the City of Kogarah were:

Kogarah City Council also managed and maintained the following localities:

Demographics 
At the 2011 Census, there were  people in the Kogarah local government area, of these 48.8% were male and 51.2% were female. Aboriginal and Torres Strait Islander people made up 0.4% of the population. The median age of people in the Kogarah City Council was 37 years. Children aged 0 – 14 years made up 17.6% of the population and people aged 65 years and over made up 14.1% of the population. Of people in the area aged 15 years and over, 54.5% were married and 8.8% were either divorced or separated.

Population growth in the City between the 2001 Census and the 2006 Census was 5.32%; and in the subsequent five years to the 2011 Census, population growth was 6.22%. When compared with total population growth of Australia for the same periods, being 5.78% and 8.32% respectively, population growth in Kogarah local government area was marginally lower than the national average. The median weekly income for residents within the city was generally on par with the national average.

Council

Composition and election method
Kogarah City Council was composed of twelve councillors elected proportionally as four separate wards, each electing three councillors. All councillors were elected for a fixed four-year term of office. The mayor was elected by the councillors at the first meeting of the council. The last election was held on 8 September 2012, and the final makeup of the council for the term 2012–2016, in order of election by ward, was as follows:

Mayors

Footnotes 
 Land component is

References

External links 
Kogarah City Council website (Archived)

Former local government areas in Sydney
1885 establishments in Australia
2016 disestablishments in Australia
Lists of local government leaders of places in New South Wales
Georges River Council